St Lachtain's GAA is a Gaelic Athletic Association club located in Freshford, County Kilkenny, Ireland. Founded in 1951, it is almost exclusively concerned with the game of hurling.

Honours
 All-Ireland Intermediate Club Hurling Championship: (1) 2010
 Leinster Intermediate Club Hurling Championships: (1) 2010
 Kilkenny Senior Club Hurling Championship: (2) 1961, 1963
 Kilkenny Intermediate Hurling Championship: (2) 1984, 2009
 Kilkenny Junior Hurling Championship: (2) 1959, 1993
 Kilkenny Minor Hurling Championship: (2)  1955, 1978
 Kilkenny Under-21 Hurling Championship: (2) 1977, 2012
 All-Ireland Senior Club Camogie Championships: (3) 2004, 2005, 2006

References

External links
 St Lachtain's GAA on GAA Info website

Gaelic games clubs in County Kilkenny
Hurling clubs in County Kilkenny